The Northern Ireland national football B team is a secondary football team run occasionally as support for the Northern Ireland national football team. Primarily seen as a stepping-stone between the under-21 and full international teams, B team matches are also used to give a run-out for fringe players and to honour Irish League players who would not otherwise gain international recognition.

Matches are rarely played by Northern Ireland at this level due to their limited player pool, necessitating rapid elevation of young players to the 'Full' squad. Matches have been played against other football associations' 'B' teams and against various national "selects".

History
The Northern Ireland 'B' team made its first appearance in 1957, playing against Romania 'B' who were not deemed worthy of a 'Full' international (note: Romania was commonly referred to as Rumania in the English language up until the 1980s).  The occasion of October 23, 1957 marked the first use of the Windsor Park floodlights for an international fixture.  A one sided match finished 6-0 with a hat-trick from Derek Dougan and further goals from Sammy McCrory, Sammy Chapman and Jackie Scott.

The match against Rumania was followed up with two matches against France B in 1959 and 1960 before Under-23 international matches became de rigueur in the 1960s.  The 'B' format re-emerged in the 1990s as national teams focussed on Under-21 rather than Under-23 matches and thus a "stepping stone" from Under-21 to 'Full' was required.

Northern Ireland's most recent match at 'B' level was against Scotland B in May 2009.

Fixtures
None

Previous matches
Performance Record:

Squad for most recent game
(vs. Scotland B, May 6, 2009)

Goalkeepers
Trevor Carson (Sunderland)
Jonathan Tuffey (Partick Thistle)
Defenders
Chris Casement (Wycombe Wanderers)
Craig Cathcart* (Manchester United)
Adam Chapman (Oxford United)
Shane Duffy (Everton)
Scott Gibb (Stirling Albion)
Jeff Hughes* (Bristol Rovers)
Daniel Lafferty (Celtic)
Rory McArdle* (Rochdale)
Ryan McGivern (Manchester City)
Robbie Weir (Sunderland)
Midfielders
Martin Donnelly* (Crusaders)
Corry Evans (Manchester United)
Shane Ferguson (Newcastle United)
Robert Garrett (Linfield)
Pat McCourt (Celtic)
Niall McGinn (Celtic)
Oliver Norwood (Manchester United)
Michael O'Connor (Crewe Alexandra) 
Forwards
Curtis Allen* (Lisburn Distillery)
James Lawrie (Port Vale)
Andrew Little (Rangers)
Josh McQuoid (AFC Bournemouth)
Dean Shiels* (Doncaster Rovers)
Jamie Ward* (Sheffield United)
 *Player withdrew from final squad.

Other previous players
Goalkeepers
Alan Fettis
Roy Carroll
David Miskelly
Elliott Morris
Tom Evans
Defenders
Iain Jenkins
Pat McGibbon
Colin Murdock
Darren Patterson
Aaron Hughes
Keith Rowland
Peter Kennedy
Barry Hunter
Stephen Craigan 
Mike Duff 
Danny Griffin 
Gareth McAuley 
Paul Morgan 
Chris Baird 
Midfielders
Jon McCarthy
Danny Sonner
Philip Mulryne
Stephen Robinson
Michael O'Neill 
Danny Lennon
Jeff Whitley
Tommy Doherty 
Grant McCann 
Wayne Carlisle 
Stuart Elliott 
Steve Jones 
Shaun Holmes
Jim Whitley 
Forwards
Gerry McMahon
George O'Boyle
David Healy
Rory Hamill 
Gary Hamilton 
Andy Kirk 
Andy Smith
 James Broome

Former coaches
(Record: Played Won-Drawn-Lost)
Peter Doherty 1957-1959 (2 1-1-0)
Len Graham 1960 (1 0-0-1)
Bryan Hamilton 1994-1997 (4 2-0-2)
Roy Millar 1998 (1 1-0-0)
Lawrie McMenemy 1999 (1 0-0-1)
Sammy McIlroy 2003 (1 0-0-1)
Nigel Worthington 2009 (1 0-0-1)

References

External links
Scotland Future-Northern Ireland 'B' Match Report
Northern Ireland B Internationals at NIFG

B
European national B association football teams